Muslim Evloev (11 June 1995 – 6 August 2020) was a Russian-Kyrgyzstani freestyle wrestler. He won a gold medal in his event at the Asian Wrestling Championships and at the Islamic Solidarity Games.

Career 

In 2017, Evloev won the gold medal in the men's 74 kg event at the Islamic Solidarity Games held in Baku, Azerbaijan. In the final, he defeated Soner Demirtaş of Turkey. In that same year, he also competed in the men's 74 kg event at the 2017 Asian Indoor and Martial Arts Games held in Ashgabat, Turkmenistan without winning a medal. He was eliminated in his second match by Döwletmyrat Orazgylyjow of Turkmenistan.

In 2018, he won the gold medal in the men's 74 kg event at the Asian Wrestling Championships held in Bishkek, Kyrgyzstan. In the final, he defeated Ganzorigiin Mandakhnaran of Mongolia. A year earlier, he won the silver medal in this event after losing against Bekzod Abdurakhmonov of Uzbekistan.

He failed an out of competition drug test in July 2018 and was banned from competitive sports until August 2022.

He was killed in August 2020 during a shoot out in a counter-terrorism operation in Nazran, Russia.

Achievements

References

External links 
 

1995 births
2020 deaths
People from Malgobek
Kyrgyzstani male sport wrestlers
Doping cases in wrestling
Kyrgyzstani sportspeople in doping cases
Deaths by firearm in Russia
Islamic terrorism in Russia
Islamic Solidarity Games medalists in wrestling
Islamic Solidarity Games competitors for Kyrgyzstan
21st-century Kyrgyzstani people